General elections were held in the Faroe Islands on 7 July 1994.

Results

See also
List of members of the Løgting, 1994–98

Elections in the Faroe Islands
Faroes
1994 in the Faroe Islands
July 1994 events in Europe